The Kitáb-i-Aqdas (Arabic: The Most Holy Book) is the central religious text of the Baháʼí Faith, written by Baháʼu'lláh, the founder of the religion, in 1873. Though it is the main source of Baháʼí laws and practices, much of the content deals with other matters, like foundational principles of the religion, the establishment of Baháʼí institutions, mysticism, ethics, social principles, and prophecies. In Baha'i literature it is described as "the Mother-Book" of the Baháʼí teachings, and the "Charter of the future world civilization".

Baháʼu'lláh had manuscript copies sent to Baháʼís in Iran some years after its writing in 1873, and in 1890–91 (1308 AH, 47 BE) he arranged for its first publication in Bombay, India. Parts of the text were translated to English by Shoghi Effendi, which, along with a Synopsis and Codification were published in 1973 by the Universal House of Justice at the centennial anniversary of its writing. The full authoritative English translation, along with clarifying texts from Baháʼu'lláh and detailed explanatory notes from the Universal House of Justice, was first published in 1992.

Etymology 
The work was written in Arabic under the Arabic title , but in English it is commonly known by its Persian pronunciation Kitáb-i-Aqdas, and is subtitled with the translation of "the Most Holy Book". The word Aqdas is a superlative form derived from the triconsonantal root Q-D-Š, denoting holiness or sanctity in Semitic languages. It is sometimes called "The Aqdas" for short.

History 
The Kitáb-i-Aqdas was written by Bahá’u’lláh in Acre about the midpoint of his Ministry around 1873. Baháʼí regard it as "revealed" and part of scripture that makes up a revelation from God. It was written as a response to inquiry of the believers about the laws of God for the new religion and how to arrange their affairs. It is indicated by one of his Tablets that after its revelation the Aqdas was withheld by him for some time before sending it to the believers in Iran.

The Question and Answers portion which is included in most publications of the Kitáb-i-Aqdas is a compilation of answers written by Bahá’u’lláh to questions put to him by various believers. It was organized by Zaynu’l-Muqarrabín, a respected transcriber of Bahá’u’lláh’s writings and one of the nineteen Apostles of Bahá’u’lláh.

By the instruction of Bahá’u’lláh the Kitáb-i-Aqdas was first published in Bombay in 1891.

A copy of the Kitáb-i-Aqdas dated from January 1887, in the handwriting of Zaynu'l-Muqarrabín, is housed at the British Library. The library's description mentions, "His copies are highly regarded for their accuracy."

Overview 

Rather than a narrative, the book is written as a series of short teachings or principles. A summary lends itself to a bullet-point list of the various ideas shared throughout the text. Main themes cover the appointment of Baháʼu'lláh's successor, who remains unnamed in the text; the layout of the future Baháʼí administration, including the mention of the Universal House of Justice and allusions to what would later be known as the Guardian; certain laws, particularly around prayer, fasting, marriage, divorce, and inheritance; admonitions toward certain individuals; and a variety of specific laws, ordinances, and prohibitions, ranging from tithes, to the Baháʼí calendar, to prohibitions on opium, slave trading, and gossip.

Besides the main themes above, the Synopsis and Codification lists the last of six themes as "Miscellaneous Subjects" and lists 33 topics:
The transcendent character of the Bahá'í Revelation
The exalted station of the Author of the Faith
The supreme importance of the Kitáb-i-Aqdas, "The Most Holy Book"
The doctrine of the "Most Great Infallibility"
The twin duties of recognition of the Manifestation and observance of His Laws, and their inseparability
The end of all learning is the recognition of Him Who is the Object of all knowledge
The blessedness of those who have recognized the fundamental verity "He shall not be asked of His doings"
The revolutionizing effect of the "Most Great Order"
The selection of a single language and the adoption of a common script for all on earth to use: one of two signs of the maturity of the human race
Prophecies of the Báb regarding "He Whom God will make manifest"
Prediction relating to opposition to the Faith
Eulogy of the king who will profess the Faith and arise to serve it
The instability of human affairs
The meaning of true liberty
The merit of all deeds is dependent upon God's acceptance
The importance of love for God as the motive of obedience to His Laws
The importance of utilizing material means
Eulogy of the learned among the people of Bahá
Assurance of forgiveness to Mírzá Yahyá should he repent
Apostrophe addressed to Tihrán
Apostrophe addressed to Constantinople and its people
Apostrophe addressed to the "banks of the Rhine"
Condemnation of those who lay false claim to esoteric knowledge
Condemnation of those who allow pride in their learning to debar them from God
Prophecies relating to Khurásán
Prophecies relating to Kirmán
Allusion to Shaykh Ahmad-i-Ahsá'í
Allusion to the Sifter of Wheat
Condemnation of Hájí Muhammad-Karím Khán
Condemnation of Shaykh Muhammad-Hasan
Allusion to Napoleon III
Allusion to Siyyid Muhammad-i-Isfahání
Assurance of aid to all those who arise to serve the Faith

Laws

While it is the core text on laws of the religion, it is not the exclusive source.

Baháʼu'lláh stated that the observance of the laws that he prescribed should be subject to "tact and wisdom", and that they do not cause "disturbance and dissension." He left for the progressive application of the laws to be decided by the Universal House of Justice; for example certain Baháʼí laws are currently only applicable to Iranian Baháʼís such as the limit to the period of engagement, while any Baháʼí may practice the laws if they so decide. Shoghi Effendi also stated that certain other laws, such as criminal laws, that are dependent upon the existence of a predominantly Baháʼí society would only be applicable in a possible future Baháʼí society. He also stated that if the laws were in conflict with the civil law of the country where a Baháʼí lives the laws could not be practiced. Baha'is believe the Aqdas supersedes and succeeds previous revelations such as the Quran and the Bible.

Form and style 

The text of the Kitáb-i-Aqdas consists of several hundred verses, which have been grouped in 189 numbered paragraphs in the English translation most of which are just a few sentences. The style combines elements of both poetry (shi'r) and rhymed prose (saj) and the text contains instances of literary devices like alliteration, assonance, repetition, onomatopoeia, juxtaposition and antithesis, metaphors, alternation of person and personification.

It is written to the individual reader, as there are no clergy in the religion. The text also moves between statements said to be plain and statements suggesting the key to understanding the book is to look at the text for clues to itself.

Translations 

The Kitáb-i-Aqdas was completed by Baháʼu'lláh in 1873. It was published in the Arabic for circulation among Baháʼís speaking the language circa 1890. A Russian translation was undertaken by Alexander Tumansky in 1899 and was his most important contribution to Baháʼí studies. Around 1900 an informal English translation was made by Baháʼí Anton Haddad, which circulated among the early American Baháʼí community in a typewritten form. In 1961, an English scholar of Arabic, Dr. Earl E. Elder, and William McElwee Miller, published an English translation, "Al-Kitab Al-Aqdas", through the Royal Asiatic Society, however its translation of the notes section was problematic and overall lacked "poetic sensibility, and skill in Arabic translation". Miller only ever used it to further his polemical agenda. In 1973 a "Synopsis and Codification" of the book was published in English by the Universal House of Justice, with 21 passages of the Aqdas that had already been translated into English by Shoghi Effendi with additional terse lists of laws and ordinances contained in the book outside of any contextual prose. Finally, in 1992, a full and authorized Baháʼí translation in English was published. This version is used as the basis of translation into many other languages highlighting the practice of an indirect translation and how the purpose of the translation affects the act of translation.  The Baháʼí Library Online provides a side-by-side comparison of the authorized translation with earlier translations of Anton Haddad and Earl Elder.

Content 

The Kitáb-i-Aqdas is supplemented by the 
"Questions and Answers"', which consists of 107 questions submitted to Baháʼu'lláh by Zaynu'l-Muqarrabin concerning the application of the laws and Baháʼu'lláh's replies to those questions
"Some Texts Revealed by Baháʼu'lláh"
Synopsis and Codification of the Laws and Ordinances, prepared by Shoghi Effendi
explanatory notes prepared by the Universal House of Justice

The book was divided into six main themes in the Synopsis and Codification by Shoghi Effendi:
The appointment of ʻAbdu'l-Bahá as the successor of Baháʼu'lláh
Anticipation of the Institution of the Guardianship
The Institution of the Universal House of Justice
Laws, Ordinances and exhortations
Specific admonitions, reproofs and warnings
Miscellaneous subjects

Further, the laws were divided into four categories:
A. Prayer
B. Fasting
C. Laws of personal status
D. Miscellaneous laws, ordinances and exhortations

Themes
Scholarly review finds the Aqdas has themes of laws of worship, societal relations and administrative organization, or governance, of the religion. Through the authority vested in ʻAbdu'l-Bahá in the Aqdas there is an expanse of internationalism related to the law in works like The Secret of Divine Civilization and through his extended authority to Shoghi Effendi works like his World Order of Baháʼu'lláh further elaborates on the internationalism theme. This stands in some distinction from other scriptures by not using triumphal tones as the voice of God is given to be viewed but rather one of progressive development, social context, and outright delay in application until another day. It insists that divine law is applicable only in situations with requisite conditions, where it is likely to have certain social effects. The goal of application of the law and its methods are not to cause disturbance and dissension and requires an appreciation for context and intention. Additionally one is to eschew emphasis in the development of textualist and intentionalist arguments about the law though some of this is visible in scholarship on the Aqdas. Such methods of application of law in a religious context are, in the opinion of Roshan Danish, common in Islam and Judaism.

The Aqdas is understood by Baháʼís to be a factor in the process of ongoing developments in world order. This can be seen comparing the Baháʼí approach to history and the future to that of the theory of the Clash of Civilizations on the one hand and the development of a posthegemony system on the other (compared with work of Robert Cox, for example, in Approaches to World Order, (Robert Cox & Timonthy Sinclair eds, Cambridge University Press, 1996).)

Certain possible sources of law are specifically abrogated: laws of the Bábí religion, notably in the Persian Bayán, oral traditions (linked with pilgrim notes, and natural law, (that is to say God's sovereign will through revelation is the independent authority.) Divine revelation's law-making is both unconditioned in terms of the divine right to choose, and conditioned in the sense of the progress of history from one revelation to the next.

Laws of personal status

Marriage and divorce

Baha'u'llah's statements about marriage in the Kitáb-i-Aqdas are brief. Marriage is highly recommended but is stated to not be obligatory. Baháʼu'lláh states that the maximum number of wives is two, but also states that having only one wife would add more tranquility to both partners. These statements were later interpreted by ʻAbdu'l-Bahá that having a second wife is conditional upon treating both wives with justice and equality and was not possible in practice, thus establishing monogamy.

That Baháʼu'lláh had three wives, while his religion teaches monogamy, has been the subject of criticism. The writing of the Kitáb-i-Aqdas and Baháʼí teachings on gender equality and monogamy post-date Baháʼu'lláh's marriages and are understood to be evolutionary in nature, slowly leading Baháʼís away from what had been a deeply rooted cultural practice.

Administration

The institutional status of the authority of ʻAbdu'l-Bahá and a House of Justice are specifically delineated. On the basis of the authority granted ʻAbdu'l-Bahá he extended forms of the authority vested in him to the Guardianship, whose sole member was Shoghi Effendi, and the Universal, or International, House of Justice through his Will and Testament. This was confirmed and amplified in other texts, notably the Kitáb-i-'Ahd. The Universal House of Justice is specifically empowered to write and rescind any laws it is felt necessary aside from those of the text of scripture and actual application of the laws of the Aqdas among Baháʼís are dependent on the choice of the Universal House of Justice.

See also 
Kitáb-i-Íqán (The Book of Certitude)
Tablets of Baháʼu'lláh Revealed After the Kitáb-i-Aqdas
Kitáb-i-ʻAhd (The Will and Testament of Baháʼu'lláh)
The Hidden Words
Baháʼí literature
Baháʼí prophecies

Notes

References

Further reading
The Kitab-i-Aqdas: its place in Baha'i literature. Published in Baháʼí World, 1992–1993. pp. 105–117.
 Danesh, Roshan (2015). Some Reflections on the Structure of the Kitáb-i-Aqdas in Journal of Baháʼí Studies, 25:3, pp. 81–94.

External links 
 Kitáb-i-Aqdas Research Tools
 Timeline and related material on Baháʼí Library Online

Works by Baháʼu'lláh
1873 books
Superlatives in religion
1873 in religion